Tendai Chitongo (born 6 September 1989) is a Zimbabwean first-class cricketer. He was part of Zimbabwe's squad for the 2008 Under-19 Cricket World Cup.

References

External links
 

1989 births
Living people
Zimbabwean cricketers
Centrals cricketers
Southern Rocks cricketers
Sportspeople from Kadoma, Zimbabwe